Kathmandu Durbar Square (Nepal Bhasa: येँ लायकु/𑐥𑐾𑑄 𑐮𑐵𑐫𑐎𑐹, Nepali: हनुमानढोका दरबार/ Basantapur Durbar Kshetra) is located in front of the old royal palace of the former Kathmandu Kingdom and is one of three Durbar (royal palace) Squares in the Kathmandu Valley in Nepal, all of which are UNESCO World Heritage Sites.

Several buildings in the square collapsed due to a major earthquake on 25 April 2015. Durbar Square was surrounded with spectacular architecture and vividly showcases the skills of the Newar artists and craftsmen over several centuries. The Royal Palace was originally at Dattaraya square and was later moved to the Durbar square.

The Kathmandu Durbar Square held the palaces of the Malla and Shah kings who ruled over the city. Along with these palaces, the square surrounds quadrangles, revealing courtyards and temples. It is known as Hanuman Dhoka Durbar Square, a name derived from a statue of Hanuman, the monkey devotee of Lord Ram, at the entrance of the palace.

Earthquake damage

On 25 April 2015, an earthquake with an estimated magnitude of 7.9 (Mw) hit the region and severely damaged the Square, reducing several buildings to rubble, the most prominent of which was the centuries-old wooden structure, Kasthamandap.

See also

 Durbar Square
 Bhaktapur Durbar Square
 Patan Durbar Square

References

Further reading
von Schroeder, Ulrich. 2019. Nepalese Stone Sculptures. Volume One: Hindu; Volume Two: Buddhist. (Visual Dharma Publications). . Contains SD card with 15,000 digital photographs of Nepalese sculptures and other subjects as public domain.

External links 

 Kathmandu Durbar Square on Google Map

Squares in Kathmandu
Durbar Square
Palaces in Kathmandu
Temples in Nepal
Kathmandu Durbar Square
Cultural heritage of Nepal
Royal residences in Nepal
3rd-century establishments in Nepal
Newa architecture